Stasera a casa di Alice is a 1990 Italian comedy film directed by Carlo Verdone.

Plot 
Saverio and Filippo are two friends who manage together the religious travel agency owned by their wives in Rome. However, Filippo's wife has discovered that he has been having an affair with Alice, a beautiful and outgoing girl. Filippo is kicked out of the household, but Saverio manage to convince his friend to abandon Alice and return back home and his duties as a family man. However, upon meeting Alice Saverio too falls deeply in love with the girl, and for a while continues to see him behind both his family and Filippo's back.

Filippo as well misses Alice terribly. Eventually he finds out about the double betrayal of Saverio. After a failed threesome with Alice, the two men agree to take turns in courting and trying to bed her, but that plan also fails. Meanwhile they are thrown out of their homes and their job, while Alice struggles to support her catatonic sister.

When her sister commits suicide, Alice decides to leave everything behind. Luckily she can take a new job as a soap-opera actress abroad. She abandons both Saverio and Filippo, leaving only a recorded message. The movie ends with the duo deciding to try once more a return to their family and normal life.

Cast 
 Carlo Verdone as Saverio
 Ornella Muti as Alice
 Sergio Castellitto as Filippo
 Yvonne Sciò as Valentina
 Cinzia Leone as Gigliola
 Paolo Paoloni as Monsignore
 Francesca D'Aloja as Chicca

References

External links

1990 films
Italian comedy films
Films directed by Carlo Verdone
1990 comedy films
1990s Italian-language films
1990s Italian films